Meshta may refer to:

 Roselle (plant), also known as Meshta
 Meshta (community), also known as Meshta, a tribal community of Karnataka, India

See also 
 Meshta Helu, alternate transliteration of Mashta al-Helu, a town and resort in north-western Syria